Navy Nurse is a 1945 American short  film directed by D. Ross Lederman and starring Warren Douglas, Andrea King, and Marjorie Riordan.

External links

1945 films
American short films
Films directed by D. Ross Lederman
American black-and-white films